The 2000 Big Sky Conference men's basketball tournament was held March 8–11 at Dahlberg Arena at the University of Montana in Missoula, Montana.

Northern Arizona defeated  in the championship game, 85–81, to win their second Big Sky men's basketball tournament title. It was NAU's second title in three years.

The Lumberjacks, in turn, received an automatic bid to the 2000 NCAA tournament. No other Big Sky members were invited this year.

Format
No new teams were added to the Big Sky prior to the 1999–2000 season, leaving total membership at nine.

No changes were made to the existing tournament format. Only the top six teams from the regular season conference standings were invited to the tournament. The two top teams were given byes into the semifinals while the third- through sixth-seeded teams were placed and paired into the preliminary quarterfinal round. Following the quarterfinals, the two victorious teams were re-seeded for the semifinal round, with the lowest-seeded remaining team paired with the tournament's highest seed and vis-versa for the other.

Bracket

See also
Big Sky Conference women's basketball tournament

References

Big Sky Conference men's basketball tournament
1999–2000 Big Sky Conference men's basketball season
Big Sky Conference men's basketball tournament
Big Sky Conference men's basketball tournament
Basketball competitions in Missoula, Montana
College sports tournaments in Montana